Kristin Berardi, who originates from Koumala, Queensland, is an Australian jazz singer. Her album with the Jazzgroove Mothership Orchestra, Kristin Berardi Meets the Jazzgroove Mothership Orchestra, was nominated for ARIA Award for Best Jazz Album at the ARIA Music Awards of 2011.

She won the International Vocal Competition of the Montreux Jazz Festival in 2006.

Berardi's version of "Strangers in the Night" was used as background music in a television advertisement for Audi automobiles in 2020.

Discography

Studio albums

Albums (as featured artist)

Awards

ARIA Music Awards
The ARIA Music Awards is an annual awards ceremony that recognises excellence, innovation, and achievement across all genres of Australian music.

|-
| 2011
| Kristin Berardi Meets the Jazzgroove Mothership Orchestra
| ARIA Award for Best Jazz Album
| 
|-

Queensland Music Awards
The Queensland Music Awards (previously known as Q Song Awards) are annual awards celebrating Queensland, Australia's brightest emerging artists and established legends. They commenced in 2006.

 (wins only)
|-
| 2016
| "Hope in My Pocket" (with Sean Foran & Rafael Karlen)
| Jazz Award
| 
|-
| 2021
| "Falling" (with Danny Widdicombe and Trichotomy)
| Jazz Award
| 
|-

References

External links
 Kristin Berardi
 Kristin Berardi, entry on JazzHead
 Kristin Berardi, entry with the Australian Jazz Agency

Australian jazz singers
Living people
21st-century Australian women singers
1981 births